Science & Faith is the second studio album by Irish rock band The Script. It was released in Ireland on 10 September 2010, via RCA Records. It was preceded by the lead single, "For the First Time", on 3 September 2010. It debuted at number one in Ireland and United Kingdom, selling 70,816 copies in its first week in the United Kingdom. In the United States, Science & Faith debuted at number three on the Billboard 200, their highest peak on the US chart, with first-week sales of 49,000 copies. The album has sold 314,000 copies in the US, and over 1.5 million worldwide. The album was met with generally mixed reviews.

Background
For the album's release in the United States, "Bullet from a Gun" was added to the track listing, and a remix of "Walk Away", featuring American rapper B.o.B, which was originally set to be a single stateside, was also added. On 16 October 2011, the album was re-released in Asia, in the form of a "Tour Edition", which again adds "Bullet from a Gun" to the track list, as well as a live version of "Science & Faith", and a bonus DVD containing the music videos for "For the First Time" and "Nothing", two behind the scenes segments, a director's cut video, a television performance clip, and a short documentary trailing the band's performance at Arthur's Day in Ireland. This particular version of the album has never been issued in Ireland or the UK.

Singles
 "For the First Time" was released as the album's lead single in Ireland on 3 September 2010, and in the United Kingdom on 5 September. It debuted at number one in Ireland, becoming their first number-one single. The song went on to peak at two on the UK Singles Chart, originally entering the chart at five. The single's release was backed with a live version of "Breakeven" from the Shephard's Bush Empire concert. A version of "Rusty Halo" from the concert was earlier released as B-side to "The Man Who Can't Be Moved".
 "Nothing" was released as the second single from the album on 19 November 2010. It peaked at number 15 in Ireland and #42 in the United Kingdom, becoming the band's lowest charting single there to date. The single was heavily promoted, with a music video being released one and a half months prior to the single's release, and the song receiving heavy radio airplay from BBC Radio 2.
 "If You Ever Come Back" was released as the third single from the album on 4 April 2011. The single was promoted through a performance during the band's stint as house band on Jason Manford's Comedy Rocks! on 30 March. A music video was also filmed to promote the release, and despite being labelled by critics as one of the standout tracks from the album, it only peaked at number 115 on the UK Singles Chart, becoming the band's worst performing single ever.
 "Science & Faith" was released as the album's fourth and final single on 27 May 2011. The single was backed with a live version of the track from the Birmingham N.E.C, which was later included on the Asian Tour Edition of the album. It was being promoted through a performance of the track during the live stages of the fifth series of Britain's Got Talent.
 "Walk Away" was originally due to be released as a single in the United States, even being remixed to feature American rapper B.o.B. However, the release was cancelled, and the remix was instead included as a bonus track on the American edition of the album. "Walk Away" was never considered for release in any other territory.

Commercial performance 
The album started atop the Irish Albums Chart with 13,200 units. At this time, the Gold certification disc was attributed for 7,500 copies sold. The IRMA certified later the album five times platinum for 75,000 units sold. At the end of year, it ranked second on biggest-selling albums chart in the country, behind Now That's What I Call Music! 77.

Track listing

(*) Additional production

Personnel
Adapted from the album's liner notes.

Danny O'Donoghue – vocals, production and strings arrangement
Mark Sheehan – guitars, production
Steve Kipner – production
Andrew Frampton – production and additional production, programming, keyboards and additional keyboards, guitars
Glen Power – drummer
Ben Sargeant –bass
The Script – drums, guitars, keyboards, vocals and programming
Nick Ingham – strings transcript and arrangement
Allan Kelly – strings arrangement assistant
Isobel Griffiths – orchestra contractor
Jo Buckley – assistant orchestra contractor
Everton Nelson – violin leader
Steve Morris – second violin leader
Louisa Fuller – violin
Boguslaw Kostecki – violin
Patrick Kiernan – violin
Rick Koster – violin
Tom Pigott-Smith – violin

Julian Leaper – violin
Ian Humphries – violin
Simon Baggs – violin
Clare Finnimore – viola
Bill Hawkes – viola
Bob Smissen  – viola
Ian Burdge – cello
Sophie Harris – cello
Paul Kegg – cello
Mary Scully – bass
Mark Stent – mixing
Matt Green – mixing assistant
Dan Frampton – recording and engineering
Greg Marriot – recording and engineering assistant
Ronan Phelan – recording and engineering assistant
Frank Cameli – recording and engineering assistant
Brandon Duncan – recording and engineering assistant
Ted Jensen – mastering

Charts and certifications

Weekly charts

Year-end charts

Decade-end charts

Certifications

Release history

References

2010 albums
The Script albums